The  Sega VR is an unreleased virtual reality headset developed by Sega in the early 1990s. Planned as an add-on peripheral for the Sega Genesis and only publicly showcased at a number of trade shows and expositions, its release was postponed and later cancelled outright after Sega ran into development issues. At least four in-progress games for the hardware were in development before its cancellation.

The project was largely driven by Sega of America; a more successful, separate, and officially released attempt at a virtual reality headset, the Mega Visor Display, was overseen by Sega's Japanese amusement divisions and United Kingdom-based collaborators Virtuality, and would be used in the VR-1 theme park ride and the Dennou Senki Net Merc arcade game. The similarly titled VR-1 is not to be confused with the Sega VR.

Features
The Sega VR's design was based on an IDEO virtual reality head-mounted display containing LCD screens in the visor and stereo headphones. Inertial sensors in the headset allow the system to track and react to the movements of the user's head.

Development
Sega of America, flush with funds from the success of its Mega Drive/Genesis, announced the peripheral in 1991. It was later seen in early 1993, at the Winter Consumer Electronics Show (CES). Sega later announced its release schedule for early 1994, according to Electronic Games.

Because of development difficulties, the Sega VR headset remained only a prototype and was never released to the general public. Then-CEO Tom Kalinske stated that the system would not be released due to it inducing motion sickness and severe headaches in users. It was last seen at the 1993 Summer CES, where it was demonstrated by Alan Hunter. It vanished from release schedules in 1994. Four games were apparently developed for the system, each using 16 MB cartridges that were to be bundled with the headset.

The company claimed to have terminated the project because the virtual reality effect was too realistic, so users might move while wearing the headset and injure themselves. The limited processing power of the system and apparent difficulties faced in converting it for use in PAL territories make this claim unlikely, although there were reports of testers developing headaches and motion sickness. Mark Pesce, who worked on the Sega VR project, says SRI International, a research institute, warned Sega of the "hazards of prolonged use".

Games
Only four original games were known to be in development.

 Nuclear Rush:  A simulation in which users pilot a hovercraft in a futuristic war.
 Iron Hammer:  In this helicopter simulation, gamers pilot a flying gunship as in EA's popular Strike series.
 Matrix Runner: Reported to be a cyberpunk adventure game inspired by Hideo Kojima's Snatcher.
 Outlaw Racing: A vehicle racing and combat game.

Sega also announced a port of Sega AM2's hit 1992 arcade game Virtua Racing as a launch game for the device, though it is not known how far this reached in development.

Legacy
Since the cancellation of the Sega VR, few attempts have been made by the company to develop virtual reality technology. A similar peripheral was reportedly made, but never seen, for the Saturn.

While Sega of America undertook development on the Sega VR, Sega of Japan endeavoured to create their own separate virtual reality project. After creating an initial agreement to collaborate with the pioneering Virtuality Group on a then-unspecified arcade project in August 1993, the two companies entered higher negotiations to make a  new, highly advanced headset by combining their previous development assets in the field of VR.

The result of the agreement was the Mega Visor Display, publicly released for the first time in July 1994 as part of the VR-1 attraction installed at Sega's flagship Joypolis indoor theme parks in Japan, as well as SegaWorld London and Sega World Sydney. Alongside the attraction, the MVD was praised in reviews at the time for its advancements in ergonomic design and graphical output, and was supposedly not fully matched in performance until the 2010s.

A second project to utilize the Mega Visor Display, the Dennou Senki Net Merc arcade game, was later demonstrated at Japan's 1995 AOU (Amusement Operators Union) show, using the Sega Model 1 arcade system board to produce its 3D graphics. Net Merc subsequently received much more muted reception, with the game's flat-shaded graphics compared unfavourably to the Sega Model 2's textured-filtered graphics when showcased.

See also
 Virtual Boy
 VR-1

References

External links
Source code at Video Game History Foundation

VR
VR
Vaporware game consoles
Virtual reality headsets
Fourth-generation video game consoles